João Diogo may refer to:

 João Diogo (footballer, born 1988), João Diogo Gomes de Freitas, Portuguese football right-back
 João Diogo (footballer, born 1999), João Diogo Jennings, Brazilian football forward